Ymer Shaba (born 21 July 1998) is an Albanian professional footballer who plays as a defender for Maltese club Pembroke Athleta and the Albania national under-21 team.

Club career

Early career
Shaba started his youth career at age of 13 at FK Dinamo Tirana academy in September 2011. He spent the 2011–12 season with under-15 side. Then he played with the under-17 side for two consecutive seasons, 2012–13 & 2013–14. From 2014 until January 2016 he was part of the under-19 side where during the first half of the 2015–16 season he played 12 matches and scored 1 goal.

Dinamo Tirana
In January 2016 he moved to the first team of FK Dinamo Tirana in the Albanian First Division. He made it his first professional debut on 12 March 2016 against Turbina Cerrik playing the full 90-minutes match finished in the 1–1 draw.

Pembroke
In summer 2019, Shaba moved abroad to play for Maltese second tier side Pembroke Athleta.

International career
Shaba was called up at Albania national under-19 football team by coach Arjan Bellaj to participate in the Roma Caput Mundi Tournament from 29 February-4 March 2016.

Shaba received his first call up at the Albania national under-21 football team by coach Alban Bushi for a gathering in Durrës, Albania from 18–25 January 2017.

He received his first call up for the Albania under-20 side by coach Alban Bushi for the double friendly match against Azerbaijan U-21 on 21 & 26 January 2018.

Career statistics

Club

References

External links

Ymer Shaba profile FSHF.org

1998 births
Living people
Footballers from Tirana
Albanian footballers
Albania youth international footballers
Albania under-21 international footballers
Association football defenders
FK Dinamo Tirana players
Pembroke Athleta F.C. players
Kategoria e Parë players
Albanian expatriate footballers
Expatriate footballers in Malta
Albanian expatriate sportspeople in Malta